Pongsakorn Takum (born August 20, 1992) is a Thai professional footballer who plays as a right-back for Thai League 2 club Rayong.

References

External links
 at Soccerway

1992 births
Living people
Pongsakorn Takum
Association football defenders
Pongsakorn Takum
Pongsakorn Takum